Husk (or hull) in botany is the outer shell or coating of a seed. In the United States, the term husk often refers to the leafy outer covering of an ear of maize (corn) as it grows on the plant. Literally, a husk or hull includes the protective outer covering of a seed, fruit, or vegetable. It can also refer to the exuvia of insects or other small animals left behind after moulting.

In cooking, hull can also refer to other waste parts of fruits and vegetables, notably the cap or sepal of a strawberry.

The husk of a legume and some similar fruits is called a pod.

Husking and dehulling

Husking of corn is the process of removing its outer layers, leaving only the cob or seed rack of the corn. 
Dehulling is the process of removing the hulls (or chaff) from beans and other seeds. This is sometimes done using a machine known as a huller. To prepare the seeds to have oils extracted from them, they are cleaned to remove any foreign objects. Next, the seeds have their hulls, or outer coverings, or husk, removed. There are three different types of dehulling systems that can be used to process soybeans: Hot dehulling, warm dehulling and cold dehulling. Hot dehulling is the system offered in areas where beans are processed directly from the field. Warm dehulling is often used by processors who import their soybeans. Cold dehulling is used in plants that have existing drying and conditioning equipment, but need to add dehulling equipment to produce high protein meal. The different dehulling temperature options are for different types of production, beans and preparation equipment.

In third-world countries, husking and dehulling is still often done by hand using a large mortar and pestle. These are usually made of wood, and operated by one or more people.

The husk is biodegradable and may be composted.

See also

Gum (botany)
Horsebread, a type of bread in which the chaff is not removed

Peel
Rice hulls
Rice pounder
Threshing
Winnowing

References

Plant morphology
Cereals

fr:Son (botanique)